Jiří Macháně (27 December 1940 – 20 January 2023) was a Czech cinematographer.

Life and career 
Born in Nové Město nad Metují, Macháně graduated in cinematography at FAMU in 1964 and started working as a cameraman with the Czechoslovak Army Film production company. He made his debut as a cinematographer in 1969, in  Jan Schmidt's Czech-Soviet co-production The Lanfier Colony.

Macháně's filmography consists of over 50 films and a number of television series. He is best known for his association with director Juraj Herz, with whom he worked in 15 films. His last work was the mystery-horror film T.M.A., released in 2009. In 2015, he received the Lifetime Achievement Award of the Association of Czech Cinematographers. He died on 20 January 2023, at the age of 82.

References

External links
 
 

1940 births
2023 deaths  
Czech cinematographers 
People from Nové Město nad Metují
Academy of Performing Arts in Prague alumni